Horst Arndt (19 September 1934 – 18 October 2014) was a West German rower who competed for the United Team of Germany in the 1956 Summer Olympics.

Arndt was born in Königsberg in 1934, which was then part of Prussia and is now located in Russia and known as Kaliningrad. He was a lifelong member of the RG Wiesbaden-Biebrich 1888, a rowing club in Wiesbaden. At the 1956 European Rowing Championships in Bled, Yugoslavia, he won a gold medal in the coxed pair with fellow rower Karl-Heinrich von Groddeck and Rainer Borkowsky as cox. The same team went to the 1956 Summer Olympics in Melbourne, Australia, where they won the silver medal in this boat class. At the 1957 European Rowing Championships in Duisburg, Germany, they again won a gold medal.

Arndt died in 2014 in Taunusstein, Germany.

References

1934 births
2014 deaths
Sportspeople from Königsberg
People from East Prussia
West German male rowers
Olympic rowers of the United Team of Germany
Rowers at the 1956 Summer Olympics
Olympic silver medalists for the United Team of Germany
Olympic medalists in rowing
Medalists at the 1956 Summer Olympics
European Rowing Championships medalists
Sportspeople from Wiesbaden